Woman of Matchless Beauty, Park Jung-geum (also known as Park Jung-geum, Heavenly Beauty) is a 2008 South Korean television drama starring Bae Jong-ok, Son Chang-min, Kim Min-jong and Han Go-eun. The series aired on MBC from February 2 to August 3, 2008 on Saturdays and Sundays at 19:55 for 52 episodes.

Plot
Park Jung-geum is far from what is conventionally considered "beautiful." She is a tough, uncompromising detective who investigates and arrests violent criminals. At the same time, she is a 38-year-old divorcee and single mother who is raising her son. Jung-geum becomes caught between two men—Yong-joon, an unmarried doctor who was her friend from elementary school, and Gyung-soo, a lawyer who is the fiancé of Jung-geum's glamorous stepsister Yoo-ra.

Cast
Main characters
Bae Jong-ok as Park Jung-geum
Son Chang-min as Jung Yong-joon
Kim Min-jong as Han Gyung-soo
Han Go-eun as Sagong Yoo-ra

Supporting characters
Lee Hye-sook as Sa Soon-ja (Yoo-ra's mother)
Park Geun-hyung as Park Bong-pil
Han Soo-yeon as Park Jung-sook
Song Ok-sook as Cha Kwang-soon
Park Jun-gyu as Jung Yong-doo
Na Moon-hee as Yoon Myung-ja (Jung-geum's mother)
Lee Seung-hyung as Hwang Byung-pal
Baek Jong-min as Oh Ji-hoon (Jung-geum's eldest son)
Kim Hak-joon as Oh Se-hoon (Jung-geum's second son)
Jo Kyung-hoon as Detective Jang
Kim Myung-kook as Squad Leader Choi
Kang Suk-jung as Detective Kim
So Do-bi as Detective Jo
Kim Mi-ra as Sergeant Kim
Bae Soo-bin as Detective
Kim Yoo-hyun as Min-ji
Im Yoon-ah as Mi-ae (guest appearance - ep 19, 20, 23)
Ahn Jae-hong
Kim Young-min
Seo Hyun
Seung Kyu

Awards
2008 MBC Drama Awards
Top Excellence Award, Actress: Bae Jong-ok
Golden Acting Award, Actor in a Serial Drama: Park Geun-hyung

References

External links
Woman of Matchless Beauty, Park Jung-geum official MBC website 

Park Jung-geum, Heavenly Beauty at MBC Global Media

MBC TV television dramas
2008 South Korean television series debuts
2008 South Korean television series endings
Korean-language television shows
South Korean crime television series
South Korean romance television series